Naagini ( female serpent) is a 2016 Indian Kannada-language supernatural fantasy television series that airs on Zee Kannada and on ZEE5 before TV telecast. The series, a remake of the Hindi serial Naaginn, is directed by Hayavadana. The series premiered on 8 February 2016.

Due to its success, a sequel  Naagini 2, was released on 17 February 2020.

Plot
The series is based on the tale of Ichchadaari Naagini, who avenged the killing of her parents, King Naagaraja (Master Sanjay) and Queen Nagarani (Jayashree Raj), by her enemies for the Naagamani (snake gem). Amrutha (Snake Princess, played by Deepika Das) lives in Takshaka Vana with her parents (the king and queen). Rudra (Arun), his friends and his brother Vishnu went there and killed Amrutha's parents for Naagamani. King Naagaraja's dead body and the Naagamani are secretly under the control of Rudra's elder brother Vishnu. 

After ten years, her aunt advised Amrutha to go to Durgapura Shiva temple. She complies, taking her deceased mother. Arjun (Dheekshith Shetty), the adopted son of Vishnu, is an innocent boy who loves Amrutha. Vikram and Saroja adopted Amrutha as their daughter. Rudra and Baba try to kill the Nagarani. Amrutha kills the first murderer, Raju, in an incomplete apartment building. Amrutha is befriended by the Snake Shesha. Amrutha learns that Rudra, his brother and his friends are the culprits. She marries Arjun. At the wedding ceremony, Shesha is killed by Rudra, Vishnu and Baba. Then Amrutha kills the second murderer, Prakash. She learns that Triveni is not the mother of Rudra and Vishnu. Naagamani is hidden in Shivalingam that was made at Takshaka Vana by Gurudeva. Triveni's real name is Damayanthi and Arjun's real name is Partha, a secret known only by the Gurudev. Lord Karthikeya gives life back to Shesha for helping Amrutha. Amrutha kills the third murderer Rudra at Garuda temple. Later, Shesha betrays Amrutha for Arjun.

Goraknath
 
A professor and researcher tries to capture Naagini for revenge. He is threatened by her when he is following her in snake form to know Naagamani. He goes to a tantrik to gain special powers. He sends his goons to capture snakes. Gurudev decides to give life to King Nagaraj for helping Amrutha. Gurudeva inserts his soul into King Maharaja's body and gives life back to King Naagaraj.

Naagini goes to the forest, sees them and tries to free the snakes. She takes the form of a snake and hides in boxes in their vehicles, to know the truth. Goraknath said the snakes would be shipped to Andaman because he has go to Andaman. Accidentally Amrutha takes Naagini into Andaman. Arjun unsuccessfully searches for Amrutha, then finally goes to Andaman, meets his friend Nanda to get help from him, and they find Amrutha. 

Goraknath captures Naagini and imprisons her. Arjun rescues her. Amrutha and Arjun run from Gora's place. 

Gora targets Arjun to capture Naagini. While Arjun is driving his car, Gora uses his power to make Arjun unconscious, and he crashes. Naagaraja takes him to the Ashram for treatment. Triveni and Amritha are informed about the accident. Later the family is informed about the accident and take him to the hospital. Poornachandra Shastri advises them to make a yajnyaa pooja to save him.

Shastriji starts the pooja and advises Amrutha that she can bring special sanjeevini mulika which can save him. Amrutha goes to the mountain, assisted by Nagaraja. He takes sanjivini and saves Arjun.

Later, Goraknath is defeated by Bhaira and Baba.

Rudra

Rudra is alive. Earlier, Amrutha killed him by Lord Kaali's power. He is later saved by the Naagamani power. Triveni asks Jyotishi about Rudra. They advise that Rudra was resurrected by his father, Jathaka. Rudra comes to their family, but he acts like a child, without memory. Vishnu goes to Bhairava Baba to know the truthwho reveals that Rudra was saved by the Naagamani power.

Rudra gets the Naagamani. He tries to kill Amrutha by taking several forms, but Naagini is helped by Poornachandra Shastri to save him. Bhairava knows the Naagamani is in Rudra's hand and tries to take it. Rudra imprisones Vishnu and hides him. Triveni and her family are bothered by Vishnu's absence. Rudra sends a man and he says that Arjun and Amrutha have to go to Vishnupura to save Vishnu.

Arjun

The family's head Triveni's real name is Damayanti and comes from the Naaga clan. She adopts Arjun as their son. Only she knows the truth that Arjun is Naagayoda.

Arjun was born with mixed divine and naga powers, incarnated for protecting Naagamani. Triveni knows the secret and takes him to their family. Her naaga guru tells him that after Arjun completes 25 years, he transforms into a Nagayoda, a powerful mahanaga.

Episodes:

 "Kanishka's attack" - When Kanishka imprisoned Amrutha, Arjun becomes a Nagayoda and protects Naagini from Kanishka.

 "Goraknath's episodes in Andaman" - Arjun becomes Naagayoda and fights the goons who were guarding Amrutha and escapes from the island.

Vishnupura and Garuda Vamsha

A village named Vishnupura worships Garuda. The Shatrughna of the village, from Garudavamsha, plans to reopen the Garuda Temple. The pujari decide to make mahapooja.
 
Following Rudra's plan, Arjun and Amrutha go to perform pooja in Vishnupura. The village Shatrughna started performing yajnya and send his sister Sowparnika to make digbandhana. Arjun and Amrutha arrive, but she does not welcome them. Arjun saves her when her rival tries to attack her to disturb the pooja. She gives them permission to enter the village and takes them to their place. Arjun and Amrutha approach the yajnya and disturb it and Shatrughna tries to punish them. Sowparnika said that they saved her from her rival's attack pooja. Arjun and Amrutha stay in Shatrughna's home. Rudra comes to Vishnupura and convinces Shatrughna that Amrutha is Naagini.

The Shatrughna and Rudra use Arjun to capture Amrutha. Amrutha is assisted by Sowparnika to save Arjun. Triveni is tense about what's happening in Vishnupura. He visits there and sees that Rudra is normal. He says "he has acted that way to kill his enemy". Triveni tries to convince him that Arjun is not naaga. After Vishnu Bhairava Baba and Shastriji, Shastri acts as enemy and tries to help Amrutha and Arjun.

Bhairava Baba and Rudra capture Amrutha and try to kill her. Arjun takes Naga form to rescue Amrutha and swallows naagamani. Amrutha defeats Bhairava and Rudra. Finally Vishnu returns with Arjun's help.

Arjun starts to get signs of naaga when he is angered. Arjun tries to punish and warn Vishnu for killing naagas. Vishnu learns of this and goes to Bhairava to save him. He advises him to give Arjun to Bali pooja in order to save him. Vishnu tries to kill Arjun before Arjun kills him. He sends him Kaalingapura. When Vishnu tries, he accidentally sees his naaga form. Rudra goes there and takes him home.

Vishnu tells Rudra of the event, but Rudra did not believe him. Arjun takes naga form and chases Vishnu. Vishnu runs out to save a life. Rudra approaches Vishnu. The duo is killed by Arjun's naaga form. Bhairava gives them their lives back. Vishnu and Rudra tell Bhairava of the incident, but he does not believe it. Once Bhairva tests Arjuna in their home and concludes that Arjun is naga and has Naagamani. Bhairva tries to take naganani from him but defeated by Arjun.

Bhairva Baba concludes and tells Vishnu and Rudra that it is impossible for them but a rival of him would kill him. That rival is an Apsara named Urmila, aspiring to take Naagamani from Arjun. They killed Shesha also by tricking her in Amrutha form.

Entry of Apsara

Amrutha and Arjun go on a trip, but a mystical old apsara takes them to an old temple. Amrutha knows Shesha's death by the trio of Vishnu, Rudra and Bhairava, chases them, kills Vishnu and Rudra, and accidentally takes them in Naga Roopa's body. Bhairav domslsEraser follows and asks for his advice. His guru said that he will defeat erasers with a weapon from his guru's atma Shakti. He would use it twice. Bhairava first uses the weapon when she released Vishnu and Rudra. The second time, she loses her sight. Bhairava tells the duo that Naagini has lost her sight, if she does not have treatment for her sight, she will give up her life. Arjun arrives and takes Amrutha home. The duo try to say that Amrutha is Naagini, but Arjun saves her.

Then, eraser controls Amrutha's mind and makes her say she needs ayurveda treatment. Eraser plans to kill Arjun and sends him to a village by disguising as an astrologer, saying he has to visit a village named Pushpagiri for Amrutha's treatment. There Amrutha starts to possess Arjun. Triveni and Urvashi try to test to reveal her as Naagini. Arjun becomes possessed by her.

In Arjun's absence, Amrutha's true identity is revealed to everyone and Amrutha is thrown from the home. When Arjun arrives, he is told she is missing. He tries to find Amrutha. Meanwhile, Triveni takes the form of Gudi, a girl whom the family members wish to marry Arjun to turn him back to human.

Amrutha blesses Vaishnavi and Kumar to get a child. Dakshayani, Kumar's mother, gets to know that Amrutha is Naagini. She instructs Amrutha to perform Shiv-Parvati Pooja to save Arjun from Urmila.

When celebrating Naagarpanchami, Arjun meets Amrutha and she decides to take him to Naagloka, but her plan is foiled and she loses Arjun. Amrutha begins the pooja by begging for money. Triveni is captured by Bhairava and becomes his companion. Gudi plans to take Arjun to Amrutha .

Bhairava suddenly tells the family members to marry Arjuna and Triveni. Shastri escapes with Arjun. He takes Arjun to the forest to meet Amrutha. He leaves Arjun with Amrutha. Bhairava sends Kanishka to get the Naagmani where he is killed by Amrutha. On Neela Amavasya, the Neeli Nagas wrapped on Arjun where Naagmani was hidden. Later Amrutha confirms Naagmani's location.

Naagini Antima Adhyaya

Amrutha learns that Nagamani is inside Arjun. As per Shastri's instruction Amrutha and Arjun unite as snakes in front of Shivalinga and the nagamani inside Arjun  comes out and goes on top of Shivalinga. Shastry says to Hema that a valuable object must be collected and she must keep it with her for a few days. Hema arrives and takes Naagmani and escapes. Amrutha comes back as human and identifies that Naagmani is missing. Then she asks Shastry about it. Shastry says that it is with Hema.  Amrutha demands Hema for Naagmani, but Hema restricts her by giving Naagmani and says that the condition was that Amrutha should give Arjun to Hema and he should marry Triveni. Then she will give Naagmani to her. Amrutha agrees to that and brings Arjun home. Hema begs Amrutha that, she should leave the house by leaving Arjun and Arjun should come to know that she is Naagini. As per Hema's instructions, Amrutha tries to kill Mani as a Naagini. Arjun learns that Amrutha is Naagini so he throws Amrutha out.

Triveni reveals to Amrutha and says that she is a Naagini, not a ghost. And that she came on earth to marry Arjun. Amrutha challenges her that she take Arjun to Naaglok for Vasuki Dynasty, not for Urmila's Takshaka Dynasty.

Arjun's family decides to marry Arjun with Urmila and takes them to temple where marry. But Amrutha had disguised herself as Urmila. Amrutha arrests Urmila and hands her to Shastry. Shastry makes Urmila a statue and then Amrutha disguises as Urmila and marries Arjun.

Arjun is not happy and badly needs Amrutha whether she is Naagini or human. Hema and Amrutha (disguised as Urmila) goes to Ashrama. Shastry tells Hema to hand Naagmani to Urmila (Amrutha) as he know that Urmila is Amrutha. So Hema gives the box of Naagmani to Amrutha, but it was Bhairava Baba, who appeared to be Amrutha. Hema learns that she has lost Naagmani. Amrutha asks Shastry about this Shastry says that she should kill one of her enemies.

Rebirth of Arjun

Arjun is reborn again as Ajanubhava (an infectious snake). He is born as a human. His grandmother says he was an Ajanubhava. He does not believe in supernatural powers. He ignores his grandmother. Agrahara, a Bhairava, puts a nagabhandhana. It was proved he was a snake. Bhairava tortures Ajanubhava and his father-in-law arrive to Puttahamsa. A Mujyaala tells Vishnu not to travel to Naagara Devasthana. Vishnu and Rudra push Mujyaala and enter Naagara Devasthana. Ajanubhava gets converted into naagayodha and save Naagara Devasthana. He defeats Vishnu and Rudra.

Defeat of Thakshaka

Bhairava converts the spirit of Naagayodha. Thakshaka helps Amrutha but he does not get Vajrahana. Bhairava decides to get a poisonous snake . Thakshaka gets angry and kills a snake. Bhairava is not able to defeat Thakshaka. He remembers that in the past he had challenged Thakshaka that he would become more powerful than him. Bhairava stands against Thakshaka but is defeated. Naagayodha, an evil spirit, later defeats Thakshaka.In the climax of naagini someone comes and kills Arjun and Amrutha.

Casting

Cast
 Deepika Das as 
 an Ichchadhari Naagin
 Shesha, Amrutha Lokk alike Naagin, Comes for Heling Amrutha
 Deekshith Shetty as 
 Arjun , husband of Amrutha 
 Partha, Nagayodha protector of Nagamani
 Shilpa Ravi as Mayuri
 Karishma Amin as Shesha
 BK Raghavendra 
 Ambarish Sarangi 
 as  Vishnu, Arjun's father
 Arjun Ramesh 
 Arun 
 as  Rudra, Vishnu's brother
 Harini Shreekanth as Hemavathi (Hema), Arjun's mother
 Ashalatha as Triveni or Damayanti, the family's head
 Cheluvaraj 
 Suryakiran 
 as Bhairava baba, a sorcerer
 Master Sanjay as King Naagaraja
 Jayashree Raj as Queen Naagarani (deceased)
 Ila Vitla as Sowparnika, Shatrughna's sister
 Kempegowda as Nanda, Arjun's friend
 Gauthami Jayaramu as Urmila

Characters
 Amruta: She is an Ichadaari Naagini and the daughter of the king and queen of Naaglok. Also, the adoptive daughter Vikram and Saroja.
 Shesha: She is an Ichchadaari Naagini made by Gurudev for helping Amrutha. She looks exactly like Amrutha. A big mole on her neck distinguishes her. She is the best friend of Amrutha. .
 Arjun: Arjun is the husband of Amrutha. He is an adopted son of Vishnu and Hema and the son of an unknown deceased father and mother Yasodha. His real name is Partha and his real identity is unknown.
 Raju: He is the first murderer of King and Queen of Naaglok. 
 Prakash: He is the second murderer of King and Queen of Naaglok. 
 Rudra: He is the third and main murderer of King and Queen of Naaglok and the first murderer of Shesha. He was the adopted son of Triveni. 
 Bairava Baba: He is the second murderer of Shesha and motivated all to steal Naagmani. He is the guru of Vishnu and Rudra. He is a greedy sorcerer.
 Vishnu: He is the adopted son of Triveni and the brother of Rudra. He is the third murderer of Shesha. He is greedy to get the Naagmani.
 Triveni: She was the adopted mother of Vishnu and Rudra. Her identity is unknown. She brings Arjun and returns to Vishnu. Her real name was Damayanthi.
 Karan: He is the step-brother of Arjun and he is jealous of Naagmani.
 Chitra: She is the wife of Karan. 
 Gurudev: He is a devotee of Lord Parameshwara. 
 Mayuri: Mayuri is a modern girl who is in love with Arjun. But she also craves his family's wealth. 
 Harsha: Harsha is Mayuri's friend and he lies to and deceives girls. 
 Hemavathi: She is called Hema for short and is the wife of Vishnu and stepmother of Arjun. She is a loving and care-taking woman.
 Vani: Vani is the wife of Rudra. She is also a loving and care-taking woman.

Dubbed versions

References

External links
Official website

2016 Indian television series debuts
Indian fantasy television series
Kannada-language television shows
Zee Kannada original programming
2020 Indian television series endings